Ypypuera is a genus of South American tree trunk spiders that was first described by C. A. Rheims & A. D. Brescovit in 2004.  it contains only three species: Y. crucifera, Y. esquisita, and Y. vittata.

References

Araneomorphae genera
Hersiliidae
Spiders of South America